The Corsica national football team is the unofficial football team for the island of Corsica, France. It is not affiliated with FIFA or UEFA. The selection has played against national teams thirteen times.

In the past, the selection has also played against club teams, as in 1963 against Stade Reims, or Inter Milan in 2012.

The match against Congo was organized by the CFA (Corsica Football Association). In order to be called up for the team, a player had to fulfil two conditions: having at least one parent or grandparent from Corsica and being a professional player or being part of a professional club.

Venue of the team 

The venue of the selection is not fixed : Corsica has played in both of the major cities of the island, Bastia and Ajaccio.
It has been said that from now on, the matches will be played alternatively in Bastia (Stade Armand Cesari) and in Ajaccio (either Stade Ange Casanova or Stade François Coty).

Team

Current squad 
The following players were called up for the friendly game against Sardinia to be played on 2 June 2019.

Caps and goals as of 8 June 2018

Recent call-ups 
The following players have been called up recently and are still eligible to represent:

Results

Corsican footballers who represented FIFA national teams

See also
:Category:Footballers from Corsica

References

External links
Squad page at CorseFootball 

 
European national and official selection-teams not affiliated to FIFA
Football teams in France